Theodore Loren Christianson (July 13, 1926 – October 25, 2019) was an American politician in the state of South Dakota. He was a member of the South Dakota House of Representatives from 1977 to 1994. Christianson, a Korean War veteran, was a farmer and insurance agent. He also served on the Astoria School Board, as Deuel County Commissioner, as Chairman of the Deuel County Republican Party, as Director of Brookings-Deuel Rural Water System, Director of South Dakota Association of Rural Water Systems, and as Director of Deuel County Farm Mutual Insurance Company. He died in 2019.

References

1926 births
2019 deaths
South Dakota Republicans